Thiry de Bry (1495–1590), son of Thiry de Bry the elder and father of Theodor de Bry, was a goldsmith in 16th-century Liège. He made a number of chalices and reliquaries that were still extant in the 18th and 19th centuries.

References

1495 births
1590 deaths
Belgian goldsmiths